The 1986 Stanley Cup Finals was the championship series of the National Hockey League's (NHL) 1985–86 season, and the culmination of the 1986 Stanley Cup playoffs. It was contested between the Campbell Conference champion Calgary Flames and the Wales Conference champion Montreal Canadiens.

This was the fifth of nine consecutive Finals contested by a team from Western Canada, the fourth of eight contested by a team from Alberta (the Edmonton Oilers appeared in six, the Flames in two, the Vancouver Canucks in one), and the third of five consecutive Finals to end with the Cup presentation on Alberta ice (the Oilers won four, the Canadiens one).

Although this was the first ever postseason meeting between the two teams, it was not the first Montreal-Calgary Finals. The first Finals between teams from Montreal and Calgary took place in  when the Canadiens defeated the Western Canada Hockey League champion Calgary Tigers.

The previous four Finals had used a 2-3-2 format, although only the latter two of those Finals lasted five games.

Paths to the Finals

Calgary defeated the Winnipeg Jets 3–0, the defending champion and in-province rival Edmonton Oilers 4–3, and the St. Louis Blues 4–3 to advance to the final.

Montreal defeated rival Boston Bruins 3–0, the Hartford Whalers 4–3, and the New York Rangers 4–1 to make it to the final.

Game summaries
Brian Skrudland's game-winning goal in game two ended the shortest overtime in NHL playoff history, at a mere nine seconds. Montreal rookie goaltender Patrick Roy was awarded the Conn Smythe Trophy as the playoff MVP.

Team rosters
Years indicated in boldface under the "Finals appearance" column signify that the player won the Stanley Cup in the given year.

Calgary Flames

Montreal Canadiens

Stanley Cup engraving
The 1986 Stanley Cup was presented to Canadiens captain Bob Gainey by NHL President John Ziegler following the Canadiens 4–3 win over the Flames in game five.

The following Canadiens players and staff had their names engraved on the Stanley Cup

1985–86 Montreal Canadiens

Riot
Some 5,000 jubilant Montreal fans celebrating the Canadiens' Stanley Cup win over the Calgary Flames rampaged through the city's downtown, causing over  worth of damage.

Broadcasting
In Canada, this was the second and final year that the English-language rights of the Cup Finals was shared between CBC and CTV. For games one and two, CBC only had the rights to air them locally in Montreal and Calgary, while CTV broadcast it to the rest of the country. CBC would then have the exclusive rights to televise games three, four and five nationally. Had the series gone to a seventh game, then both CBC and CTV would have simultaneously televised it while using their own production facilities and crews. After the season, CTV pulled the plug on their two-year-long venture with the NHL, and their rights package was eventually given to the Global-Canwest consortium.

In the United States, this was the first of three consecutive seasons that ESPN televised the Cup Finals.

See also
 List of Stanley Cup champions
 1985–86 NHL season

References

Notes

 
Stanley
Calgary Flames games
Montreal Canadiens games
Stanley Cup Finals
Stanley Cup Finals
1980s in Montreal
1986 in Quebec
Stanley Cup Finals
1980s in Calgary
Ice hockey competitions in Montreal
Ice hockey competitions in Calgary